Charles Kellogg (December 4, 1839 in Minden, Montgomery County, New York – 1903) was an American politician from New York.

Life
He was the son of Assemblyman Daniel F. Kellogg (1807–1864) and Emily Dunham Kellogg (1814–1882). He attended Yates Polytechnic Institute. He graduated from Albany Law School in 1863, and practiced law in Chittenango. He married Ann Elizabeth Moody (1841–1922), and they had several children.

He was a member of the New York State Senate (21st D.) in 1874 and 1875.

He was buried at the Oakwood Cemetery in Chittenango.

Sources
 Life Sketches of Government Officers and Members of the Legislature of the State of New York in 1875 by W. H. McElroy and Alexander McBride (pg. 67f) [e-book]
 Oakwood Cemetery transcriptions

External links

1839 births
1903 deaths
Republican Party New York (state) state senators
People from Minden, New York
People from Chittenango, New York
Albany Law School alumni
19th-century American politicians